The Stadt- und Kreissparkasse Leipzig ("City and Regional Saving Bank of Leipzig") is a , a public savings bank, based in Leipzig, Saxony. It is one of the largest financial institutions in the new German Länder.

Organizational structure
The Sparkasse Leipzig is a trustee institution under public law. Carrier is the Sparkassenzweckverband für die Stadt- und Kreissparkasse Leipzig and the Land Nordsachsen.
The Savings Bank is a member of the East German Savings Bank Association (Ostdeutscher Sparkassenverband). The legal basis of the credit institution is the savings bank law of the Federal State of Saxony and the Statute of the Sparkasse.

The management-bodies of the savings bank are the board of directors and the executive board. The chairman of the board is the Leipzig Mayor Burkhard Jung. The executive chairman is Harald Langenfeld. Private Clients Management Board is Martin Bücher. Corporate-board is Andreas Koch. Andreas Nüdling is deputy member.

Business strategy and business success
The Sparkasse Leipzig is the third largest savings bank in the new Länder after the Ostsächsische Sparkasse Dresden and the Mittelbrandenburgische Sparkasse.

It is the market-leader in retail-banking, as well as in corporate and business customers of their business area and works together with business of Sachsen Bank, the LBS Ostdeutsche Landesbausparkasse AG, the Sparkassen-Versicherung Sachsen, and the DekaBank.

Its business area comprises the city of Leipzig, the Nordsachsen and Altlandkreis Leipziger Land for a size of approximately 3,085 square kilometers.

The Sparkasse Leipzig had total assets for 8,902 billion euros and customer deposits for 7,153 billion euros in fiscal year 2014. According to the Savings Bank Ranking 2014, it is by total assets ranked 18th; it maintains 135 branches and employs 1,663 staff.

History
The savings bank opened in 1826 not far from the present-day headquarters premises at Löhrs Carré. Influential citizens of the city had suggested the establishment of an institution, which should allow the interest-bearing and secure investment of funds.

Social commitment 
As a public institution, the Sparkasse Leipzig is committed to its business area. In addition to the foundation (Stiftung) it has a Savings Bank Museum and a Kunsthalle, granted an insight into its collection of works of the New Leipzig School. In addition, the bank acts as a partner of associations and institutions, thus demonstrating its support for the common good.

The Sparkasse Leipzig Foundation
Media Foundation of Sparkasse Leipzig 
The main purpose of the Media Foundation is to promote the education and training of young people in the field of media. These include the awarding of merit scholarships, for example in the context of the Leipzig Media Prize, targeted project funding and the organization of events on political education, about to commemorate the fall of 1989 in Leipzig.

Cultural and Environmental Foundation of Sparkasse Leipzig Leipziger Land 
To mark its 175th anniversary in 2001, the Sparkasse Leipzig decided to create the Cultural and Environmental Foundation Leipziger Land. The work of the Foundation was presented in October 2001 in a ceremony to the public. The Foundation deals with the history of the former district of Leipziger Land, nature conservation and landscape conservation, environmental protection and the training of young people from this region. The promotion of cultural interests of the literature on performing and visual arts to heritage conservation are also among the tasks of the Foundation.

Sparkassenstiftung for the region Torgau-Oschatz 
The purpose of this foundation is to promote culture and heritage conservation within the territory of the Torgau-Oschatz Altlandkreises from the proceeds of the endowment. The foundation's aims are realized through the promotion of music, literature, performing and visual arts and their institutions. In addition, the Foundation is committed through the acquisition and management of works of art, including the holding of exhibitions and cultural events such as concerts and art exhibitions. The earmarked funds to tax-deferred awarding bodies or public corporations to acquire art works and art objects is one of the tasks of the Foundation. Furthermore, their portfolio includes the foundation of art prices and promoting heritage conservation in accordance with the law for the protection and maintenance of monuments in the former district Torgau-Oschatz. This is done through the provision of earmarked funds for the conservation and restoration of monuments.

The Kunsthalle der Sparkasse Leipzig 

The Kunsthalle is located at one of the oldest savings bank locations in Leipzig. Acquired in 1914 by the Sparkasse, the building was its main location until the Second World War and its expropriation in 1950. Since 1994, it is again in possession of the Sparkasse, and it has been extensively renovated. The Kunsthalle has 352 m2 of exhibition space in the annex from 1924, right on the banks of the splices mill race and shows works from the collection of the Sparkasse Leipzig. With around 3000 exhibits of 150 artists who live and work in and around Leipzig, it holds the largest collection of "Leipzig School".

Sparkasse Leipzig Museum 
The permanent exhibition of the Sparkasse Museum is divided into five chapters of the Leipziger Sparkasse history - from the first initiative of the Leipzig Sparkasse founder up to the financial service of the present. In the background it shows the social, economic and political developments of the 19th and 20th centuries. Visitors can see the first major book of Sparkasse Leipzig (1826-1838), one of the first armored safes from the mid-19th century, savings books and currencies from different eras, office machinery and equipment from the last century, and historical advertising among other things.

References

External links
  
 Media Foundation of Sparkasse Leipzig
 Kultur- und Umweltstiftung Leipziger Land 
 Stiftung für die Region Torgau-Oschatz 

Banks of Germany
Companies based in Leipzig